The 2019 Keio Challenger was a professional tennis tournament played on hardcourts. It was the 14th (men's) and third (women's) editions of the tournament and part of the 2019 ATP Challenger Tour and the 2019 ITF Women's World Tennis Tour. It took place in Yokohama, Japan between 25 February and 10 March 2019.

Men's singles main-draw entrants

Seeds

 1 rankings are as of 18 February 2019

Other entrants
The following players received wildcards into the singles main draw:
  Shinji Hazawa
  Masamichi Imamura
  Naoto Kai
  Sung Yo-han
  Kaito Uesugi

The following player received entry into the singles main draw using a protected ranking:
  Daniel Nguyen

The following players received entry into the singles main draw using their ITF World Tennis ranking:
  Moez Echargui
  Ivan Gakhov
  Skander Mansouri
  David Pérez Sanz

The following players received entry from the qualifying draw:
  Kim Cheong-eui
  Tseng Chun-hsin

The following player received entry as a lucky loser:
  Shintaro Imai

Women's singles main-draw entrants

Seeds

 1 rankings are as of 25 February 2019.

Other entrants
The following players received wildcards into the singles main draw:
  Ayumi Hirata
  Anri Nagata
  Risa Ozaki
  Satoko Sueno

The following players received entry into the singles main draw using their ITF World Tennis ranking:
  Lee Hua-chen
  Nudnida Luangnam
  Anna Morgina
  Naho Sato
  Anna Ureke

The following players received entry from the qualifying draw:
  Mayuka Aikawa
  Shiho Akita
  Catherine Harrison
  Kyōka Okamura
  Akiko Omae
  Risa Ushijima

Champions

Men's singles

 Kwon Soon-woo def.  Oscar Otte 7–6(7–4), 6–3.

Women's singles
 Greet Minnen def.  Elena-Gabriela Ruse, 6–4, 6–1

Men's doubles

 Moez Echargui /  Skander Mansouri def.  Max Purcell /  Luke Saville 7–6(8–6), 6–7(3–7), [10–7].

Women's doubles
 Choi Ji-hee /  Han Na-lae def.  Rutuja Bhosale /  Akiko Omae, 6–1, 7–5

External links
Official Website
2019 Keio Challenger at ITFtennis.com

2019 ATP Challenger Tour
2019 ITF Women's World Tennis Tour
2019 in Japanese tennis
2019
February 2019 sports events in Japan
March 2019 sports events in Japan
2019 Keio Challenger